The Sam B. Hall Jr. Federal Building and United States Courthouse, formerly known as the Marshall Federal Building and  U.S. Post Office, was built in 1915.  It is a Classical Revival building designed by Oscar Wenderoth (supervising architect) and George Shaul.

It is used as a courthouse by the U.S. District Court for the Eastern District of Texas. The courthouse was renamed in 1994 to honor state representative and district judge Sam B. Hall Jr. It was listed on the National Register of Historic Places in 2001.

See also

National Register of Historic Places listings in Harrison County, Texas
List of United States federal courthouses in Texas

References

External links

Photo of the federal building at the Federal Judicial Center website
Old Post Office / Sam B. Hall Federal Courthouse from the Center for Regional Heritage Research, Stephen F. Austin State University

Federal buildings in the United States
Neoclassical architecture in Texas
Government buildings completed in 1915
Buildings and structures in Harrison County, Texas
Post office buildings on the National Register of Historic Places in Texas
National Register of Historic Places in Harrison County, Texas